Mennan Yapo (born 1966) is a German director, screenwriter, producer and actor.

Born in Munich to Turkish parents, Yapo has been in the film business since 1988, working in various assistant jobs and as a publicist at first.

From 1995, Yapo worked as a screenwriter and producer, as well as a supporting actor (in Peter Greenaway's The Pillow Book, 1996, and Wolfgang Becker's Good Bye Lenin!, 2003).

1999 marked Yapo's first outing as a director. His directing debut, the short subject Framed, was nominated for the Deutscher Filmpreis and shown at numerous international festivals.

In 2002, Yapo started working on his first full-length directing work, the thriller Soundless which became a German box-office success in 2004. It also won international critical acclaim.

Yapo's Hollywood directing debut, the drama film Premonition, starring Sandra Bullock, was released to cinemas in March 2007 and grossed $85 million worldwide.

Filmography 
Director
 1999: Framed (short film)
 2004: Soundless
 2007: Premonition
Producer
 1996: After Hours
 1999: Framed
 2001: Birth:day
 2013: Planet USA
Actor
 1996: The Pillow Book, as "Café Typo" Manager
 2003: Good Bye, Lenin!, as Flea Market Vendor

External links 

 http://www.mennanyapo.com

1966 births
Living people
English-language film directors
Film directors from Munich
German people of Turkish descent